Luke Sayers AM is an Australian businessman. He is the former CEO of PricewaterhouseCoopers Australia. Since 2012, Sayers has served on the board of the Carlton Football Club and became the President of Carlton Football Club on August 17, 2021. In 2019, Sayers was made a Member of the Order of Australia for his significant service to business, to people with a disability, and to the community.

Business career
Sayers served as CEO of PricewaterhouseCoopers Australia for eight years. which is a company that provides professional services networks in the world by delivering quality in Assurance, Tax and Advisory services. Sayers later became the executive chairman of Sayers Group, which is a Melbourne-based investment and advisory company.

Sports Administration career

Carlton Football Club
Sayers joined the Board of directors at the Carlton Football Club in 2012. On 28 April 2021, it was announced that the board of the club unanimously elected Sayers as president-elect, at a board meeting to take over the role at the end of the 2021 season. In June 2021, Sayers in his role as president-elect, during the transition period, also initiated a panel that consisted of Carlton Football Club CEO Cain Liddle with external panel members Matthew Pavlich, Geoff Walsh and Graham Lowe to lead an independent external review into the club’s football department operations in the wake of poor on-field results in the 2021 season due to disappointment of expectations.

Sayers officially became the President of Carlton Football Club on 17 August 2021, just one round before the end of the 2021 season, after previous club president Mark LoGiudice stepped down from the role early. The completion of the independent external club review, led by Sayers also led to a clean-out at the club with substantial changes to the club's administration and football department.

On 10 September 2021, Sayers also stated: 
“We are entering a reset phase for our football club, and while we have built a strong platform in a business sense, the ability to ensure our on-field position matches, our off-field one is an area that must be addressed,”.

Sayers appointed outgoing Geelong Football Club CEO Brian Cook as the CEO of the Carlton Football Club as one of the substantial personnel changes to the club's administration to replace Cain Liddle, after Liddle was sacked from his position as CEO of Carlton as one of the outcomes of the completion of the independent external review that the club had undertaken, where it was determined by the club, that the gaps between on and off-field performance were too large for Liddle to maintain his position as CEO. Sayers on the appointment of Cook said in a statement: 
"Cook’s ability to deliver a sustained level of high performance across every facet of a football club made him the perfect person to take the Blues forward, This is a significant pillar of the Club’s ‘reset’ strategy, whereby our football club is striving to bring in the best available people with strong leadership, who thrive on building and driving a high-performing culture, That is exactly what Carlton needs to take our next, significant step, and nobody fits that criteria better than Brian Cook. While our club is in a strong position off the field, we intend to take this to another level, by being proactive and innovative and Brian, as CEO, will play a pivotal role in leading that approach".

The club review led by Sayers also led to the sacking of David Teague as Carlton Football Club senior coach, when Sayers said in a statement “After careful consideration was taken and the necessary time to absorb the findings of the review... it was made clear that the decision needed to be made to part ways with David Teague”, after Sayers further stated "it was identified in the review, that there had been confusion associated with the game plan at times and on-field, the team has underdelivered in its ability to consistently defend, win the contest and apply pressure". Also, the club review led by Sayers found that Teague's coaching methods and gameplan were supported by only 30 percent of the club's players and the club's staff. The club review led by Sayers then led to the appointment of Michael Voss as the Carlton Football Club senior coach, as one of the other substantial personnel changes to the club's football department, when Sayers said in a statement "After a thorough and considered selection process, Voss's credentials and vast experience in football made him the right person for the job,".

Order of Australia
In 2019, Sayers was made a Member of the Order of Australia for his significant service to business, to people with a disability, and to the community.

References 

Living people
Year of birth missing (living people)
Australian chief executives
Members of the Order of Australia